Trilofo may refer to several places in Greece:

Trilofo, Arcadia, a village in the municipality of Megalopoli, Arcadia
Trilofo, Imathia, a village in the municipal unit of Dovras, Imathia
Trilofo, Phthiotis, a village in the municipal unit of Makrakomi, Phthiotis
Trilofo, Pieria, a village in the municipal unit of Elafina, Pieria
Trilofos, a village in the municipal unit of Thermi, Thessaloniki regional unit